Luka Palamarchuk  (6 September 1906 – 26 December 1985) was a Ukrainian politician, journalist and diplomat. He was Minister of Foreign Affairs of the Ukrainian SSR from 1953 to 1965.

Education 
Born in Vinnitsa region in 1906, Luka Palamarchyk graduated from the Faculty of History of the Taras Shevchenko National University of Kyiv (1949) and the Higher Party School of the Communist Party of Ukraine (1950).

Professional career and experience 
In 1929–1941 – he worked as a journalist.

In 1941–1942 – chairman of the Radio Committee of the Council of People's Commissars of the Ukrainian SSR.

In 1943–1952 – he was executive editor of "Radaynska Ukraine", he edited the Ukrainian satirical newspaper Perets'.

In 1952–1954 – Deputy Minister of Foreign Affairs of the Ukrainian SSR.

From 17 June 1953 to 11 May 1954 – Acting Minister of Foreign Affairs of the Ukrainian SSR.

From 11 May 1954 to 13 August 1965 – Minister of Foreign Affairs of the Ukrainian SSR Headed the Ukrainian delegation to sessions of the UN General Assembly.

From 13 August 1965 to 25 October 1972 – Ambassador Extraordinary and Plenipotentiary of the Soviet Union in Morocco.

He died in Kiev on 26 December 1985 at the age of 79.

Diplomatic rank 
 Ambassador Extraordinary and Plenipotentiary

References

External links 
 Luka Palamarchuk of the Soviet Ukraine indicated Moscow is primarily interested in a treaty to keep nuclear weapons from the West German armed forces
 Documents on Ukrainian Jewish Identity and Emigration, 1944-1990 Vladimir Khanin. Psychology Press, 2003 - 350
 Diplomacy in the Former Soviet Republics James P. Nichol Greenwood Publishing Group, 1.01.1995 - 244.
 Soroka D. I. Historical retrospective of Ukraine's cooperation with the United Nations
 Ukrainian Soviet Encyclopedia

1906 births
1986 deaths
People from Vinnytsia Oblast
People from Vinnitsky Uyezd
Communist Party of Ukraine (Soviet Union) politicians
Soviet foreign ministers of Ukraine
Second convocation members of the Verkhovna Rada of the Ukrainian Soviet Socialist Republic
Third convocation members of the Verkhovna Rada of the Ukrainian Soviet Socialist Republic
Fourth convocation members of the Verkhovna Rada of the Ukrainian Soviet Socialist Republic
Fifth convocation members of the Verkhovna Rada of the Ukrainian Soviet Socialist Republic
Sixth convocation members of the Verkhovna Rada of the Ukrainian Soviet Socialist Republic
Permanent Representatives of Ukraine to the United Nations
Ukrainian editors
20th-century Ukrainian journalists
Recipients of the Order of the Red Banner of Labour
Burials at Baikove Cemetery